Seyyed Ali Riaz is an Iranian dentist and conservative politician who served a member of the Parliament of Iran from 2004 to 2008, representing Tehran, Rey, Shemiranat and Eslamshahr.

References

1958 births
Living people
Members of the 7th Islamic Consultative Assembly
Deputies of Tehran, Rey, Shemiranat and Eslamshahr
Islamic Association of Physicians of Iran politicians
Alliance of Builders of Islamic Iran politicians